Nagahama may refer to:

People
 Nagahama (surname)

Places
 Nagahama, Ehime, a former town in Kita District, Ehime, Japan; now part of Ōzu
 Nagahama, Shiga, a city in Shiga Prefecture, Japan
 Nagahama Castle, a hirashiro (castle on a plain) in Nagahama, Shiga
 Nagahama Station, a train station on the Hokuriku Main Line, Nagahama, Shiga
 Nagahama Hall,  a concert hall, in Hideyo Noguchi Memorial Park, Yokohama, Japan

Other uses
 6655 Nagahama, a main-belt asteroid
 Nagahama (moth), a moth genus of the family Crambidae